Ndeye Khadidiatou Dieng (born 1 December 1994) is a Senegalese basketball player for DUC Dakar and the Senegalese national team.

She participated at the 2018 FIBA Women's Basketball World Cup.

References

External links

1994 births
Living people
Guards (basketball)
Senegalese expatriate basketball people in the United States
Senegalese women's basketball players
Basketball players from Dakar